Edwin Morgan may refer to:

 Edwin Morgan (poet) (1920–2010), Scottish poet
 Edwin B. Morgan (1806–1881), U.S. Representative from New York
 Edwin D. Morgan (1811–1883), New York governor and U.S. Senator
 Edwin D. Morgan (businessman) (1921–2001), American director of the Pioneer Fund
 Edwin D. Morgan III (1854–1933), American yachtsman
 Edwin Vernon Morgan (1865–1934), American diplomat and ambassador

See also
Edward Morgan (disambiguation)